The Shelburne Wolves were a Junior "A" ice hockey team from Shelburne, Ontario, Canada.  This defunct hockey team was a part of the Metro Junior A Hockey League and Ontario Provincial Junior A Hockey League.

History
In the late 1990s, the Metro Junior A Hockey League pushed North.  In 1995, they brought in the Shelburne Hornets who were affiliated with the then operational Hockey Training Institute (HTI). After the 1995/1996 season the Hornets rebranded themselves and were labeled the Wolves. Despite the fervour for hockey in the town of Shelburne, the Hornets/Wolves were never overly competitive and subsequently folded after four seasons. Even though the Hornets/Wolves had short history, its club was filled with many NHL hopefuls, although none ever made any full NHL rosters.

Season-by-season results

Playoffs
MetJHL Years
1996 DNQ
1997 DNQ
1998 Lost Preliminary
Oshawa Legionaires defeated Shelburne Wolves 3-games-to-none
OJHL Years

Notable alumni
Max Birbraer
Nick Smith

External links
OHA Website

Defunct Ontario Provincial Junior A Hockey League teams